Yarino is a rural locality (a settlement) in Dobryansky District, Perm Krai, Russia. The population was 432 as of 2010. There are 20 streets.

Geography 
Yarino is located 21 km east of Dobryanka (the district's administrative centre) by road. Traktovy is the nearest rural locality.

References 

Rural localities in Dobryansky District